Roy Haynes is an American jazz drummer.

Roy Haynes may also refer to:

 Roy Asa Haynes (1881–1940), Assistant Secretary of the Treasury in charge of Prohibition enforcement
 Roy Haynes (designer), car designer and stylist

See also
 Roy Martin Haines, British historian